Club Deportivo Luis Ángel Firpo (often abbreviated to Firpo) is an El Salvador professional association football club based in Usulután.

The club was founded in 1923, and has played at its current home ground, Estadio Sergio Torres, since 1930.

They have won ten Primera Division Champions titles. Firpo has the fourth highest total of major honours won by a Salvadoran club. The club's most successful period was between 1988 and 2000, when they won the El Salvadoran title seven times.

Firpo's historical rival is Aguila. The Derby de Oriente (vs Aguila) is the most important game of the season.

The club's traditional kit colours are white and red, blue is also used but it is less predominant. The colours were adopted from the Argentinian side San Lorenzo de Almagro, of which Luis Ángel Firpo was a supporter.

Overview
Club Deportivo Luis Ángel Firpo is the second-oldest club in El Salvador.  The club was founded on September 17, 1923, by a group of local citizens.  Originally named Tecún Umán, the club was soon renamed in honor of Luis Ángel Firpo, a famous Argentine boxer, who became the first Latin American to fight for the heavyweight championship, knocking Jack Dempsey out of the ring on September 14, 1923.

Some of the most prominent players from El Salvador, including Mauricio Cienfuegos and Raúl Díaz Arce, have played for L.A. Firpo. The team has won a total of ten  championships, the first coming in 1988–89 and the most recent in the 2013 Clausura.

The team plays its home games at Estadio Sergio Torres in Usulután. The team's mascot is the bull, a reference to Firpo, who was known as the Wild Bull of the Pampas.

History

Early history
On September 17, 1923, a group of Usulután citizens, mostly of European descent, decided to form a team that represented their community's passion for football. The club elected Gustavo Denys as their first club chairman. They decided to choose red and blue as their team's colours. Originally named Tecún Umán, the club was soon renamed in honor of Luis Ángel Firpo, a famous Argentine boxer.

On November 9, 1923, Club Deportivo Sandino, also based in Usulutan, wanted to merge with Firpo, and it almost came to fruition. However, the main sticking point was that Sandino wanted to appoint the majority of the 41 club directors (36 to Sandino and only five Firpo directors). Following the impasse, Firpo rejected the offer.

The members of CD Luis Ángel Firpo acquired land near Sergio Torres creek to develop and build a stadium.  Their first football manager was Manuel "El Zancudo" Segurado. In 1941–42, they were named the best team in eastern El Salvador and were allowed to challenge for the national title. A year later, Luis Antonio Regalado brought the club further prestige when he was chosen for the El Salvador's national football team. After him came the Zamora brothers (Ricardo and Miguel), the Quinteros brothers (Leonidas and Lázaro), and Ramón and Mario Águila.

Financial instability plagued Firpo in the 1950s and 1960s, and they dropped out of the top flight on three separate occasions. In 1972, Firpo became a permanent top-flight fixture.

Golden generation
In the 1988–89 season, the team hoisted the league title for the first time. The team finished third in the regular season, but the club nonetheless dismissed Argentinian coach Juan Quarterone before the playoffs. In his place, they hired former player Julio Escobar. Escobar justified the club's faith by leading the team through the championship round and into the finals.  Their match against Cojutepeque was drawn 2–2 after extra time, setting up a penalty shootout.  Firpo prevailed 4–3, with Leonel Carcamo scoring the winning penalty.

In the 1990 final, the team lost to Alianza but won their second crown in 1991.  That season saw Firpo go on a 30 match unbeaten streak and defeat Aguila 1–0 in the finals. Marlon Menjívar scored the only goal.

The following year, Macedonian Kiril Dojčinovski took over the coaching reins of Firpo and led them to back to back titles.  The stars of this run were Raúl Toro, Raúl Díaz Arce, Mauricio Cienfuegos, Celio Rodríguez, Leonel Cárcamo and Fernando de Moura.  They defeated Alianza in both finals, giving the club four championships in five years.

Soon after, Leonal Carcamo donned the captain's armband and the club continued to play at a high level.  They reached either the semi-finals or finals every year from 1994 to 1997, then won the championship again in 1998.  That win came over FAS 2–0, with the goals being scored by Raúl Toro and Abraham Monterrosa.

Firpo won another championship in 1999, beating FAS 5–4 on penalty kicks.  In 2000, Club president and owner Sergio Torres died the week before the final match against ADET, and the players dedicated the match to his memory.  They went on to win, bringing home their seventh title.

Modern era
After 2000, Firpo's success began to decline. With players retiring, moving abroad, or being sold onto other clubs, the death of Sergio Torres cost the team their primary sponsor and led the club into financial instability.  As a result, Firpo reached the grand final repeatedly, but could not win another title for seven years.

In the 2007 Apertura, Argentinian coach Horacio Cordero guided the team to another final, and they defeated FAS 5–3 in a penalty shootout. 
The next season saw the club hoist the crown again, winning the Clausura 2008.  They beat FAS again, 1–0, and celebrated their third repeat championship.

The team won their tenth title in the 2013 Clausura under the direction of Argentinian coach Roberto Gamarra with another win over their rivals from FAS.

On May 5, 2014, after 32 years of top-flight football, Firpo were relegated to the second division after a 1–1 draw with Dragón. However, the relegation didn't stay, as Firpo purchased Juventud Independiente's license. On May 27, 2019, the club achieved a record sixth relegation from the Primera Division, after the team lost 3–1 against Alianza.

At the end of the 2020 season, Pablo Herrera (owner of the franchise license of Independiente) announced that Independiente will lose their license and he will be giving the license to Luis Angel Firpo for the Clausura 2020.

Honours
Luis Angel Firpo is historically the fourth most successful team in El Salvador football, as they have won ten championships. it occupy the top position in the ranking of the Usulutan football based teams. The club's most recent trophy came in June 2013, with the Clausura 2013.

Domestic honours

League
 Primera División and predecessors 
 Champions (10): 1988–89, 1990–91, 1991–92, 1992–93, 1997–98, 1999 Clausura, 2000 Clausura, Apertura 2007, Clausura 2008, Clausura 2013
 Segunda División Salvadorean and predecessors 
 Champions: TBD
 Tercera División Salvadorean and predecessors 
 Champions: TBD

Cups
 Copa President and predecessors 
 Runners-up (1) : 2000

CONCACAF
 CONCACAF Cup Winners Cup 
 Runners up (1) : 1995 CONCACAF Cup Winners Cup

Club statistics and records

Raúl Díaz Arce is Firpo's all-time top goalscorer, with 119 goals.

Stadium
CD Luis Ángel Firpo plays most of its home games at Estadio Sergio Torres in Usulután, better known throughout Central America as the Devil's Cauldron. Located in the Barrio La Parroquia, the stadium is an exception in El Salvador's professional football: As Firpo is the only team in the First Division that plays in its own stadium. Firpo's first president, Mr. Gustavo Demis, bought two thirds of the stadium and, in 1950, the then-president Mr. Juan Boillat bought the other third. In 1987, the stadium was renamed after the former owner and president of the team. The stadium known as Usulután Stadium became known as Sergio Torres Rivera Stadium. However, the club has moved games to Estadio Cuscatlán.

Home stadium
 Estadio Sergio Torres (1950–present)
 Estadio Cuscatlán (2002–present) (big game venue)

Fan culture

Club badge and colours 
Luis Angel Firpo's home colours are white, blue and red. Traditional away kit colours have been either red or white and blue; however, in recent years several different colours have been used.

Their first logo contained a figure of a bull in honor of the "toro de las pampas" of the boxer Luis Ángel Firpo. However, later the board of Luis Ángel Firpo decided to replace the bull with the official coat of arms of Luis Ángel Firpo which consisted of a triangle with two half circles which contained the blue and white letters of the club. On top of the coat of arms contains stars which indicate the number of titles the team has won, which currently is at ten.

Kit manufacturers and shirt sponsors 
Luis Angel Firpo's shirts have been sponsored by Pilsener since 2017. Previous sponsors have been Tapachulteca (1988–1999), TACA (1992), Pepsi (1999), Diana (2007–2013), Pilsener (2007–2013), Burger King (2013) and Tigo (2009). Their kits have been manufactured by Aviva (since 2018). Prior manufacturers have been Galaxia (1999–2007, 2018), Kelme (2017) and Joma (2009–2013).

Anthem
Ahí viene el Firpo.
Hoy vibran los estadios en todo El Salvador.
Oriente hace al Firpo el equipo ganador,
¡Viva el Firpo, Viva el Firpo!
La garra y el coraje del buen usuluteco,
Se siente cuando el Firpo comienza a golear.
¡Viva el Firpo, Viva el Firpo!
Firpo es el equipo ganador,
Orgullo de mi patria El Salvador.
¡Viva el Firpo!

Rivalries
Luis Ángel Firpo v. Alianza. The match is known as (Clásico Joven) (Young classic) Although Alianza has one more title than Firpo.
Luis Ángel Firpo v. Águila. The match is known as (Clásico de Oriente) (Eastern Classic). They are from the same Zone.
One smallest but stronger and old rivalry could be Luis Ángel Firpo v. FAS.

Supporters 
Despite having a growing fan base across the country, there were no official fan groups until 1990 when Manuel Viagra founded the "Furia Pampera" in Usulután.
They are currently the second largest fan base in San Salvador and the fourth largest nationwide.

Famous supporters
 Politics: Tony Saca (Former President of El Salvador)
 Politics: Roberto D'Aubuisson (Current Mayor of Santa Tecla)

Presidential history
Luis Ángel Firpo has had numerous presidents over the course of their history, some of which have been the owners of the club while others have been honorary presidents. Here is a complete list of them.

Players

Current squad
:

Players with dual citizenship
   TBD

Out on loan

In

Out

Current technical staff